Masný or Masny (feminine form Masná or Masna) is a Czech–Slovak (Masný/Masná) or Polish (Masny/Masna) surname. It is derived either from Czech maso or Slovak mäso for "meat" or from Old Polish masny, maśny (cf. the Polish adjective mięsny) with the meaning "meat-", "meaty", all originating from Proto-Slavic *męso ("meat"). People with this name include:

 Karol Masny (1887–1968), Polish officer
 Lenka Masná (born 1985), Czech runner
 Magdalena Masny (born 1969), Polish model
 Marián Masný (born 1950), Slovak former football player
 Michal Masný (born 1979), Slovak volleyball player 
 Vojtech Masný (born 1938), Slovak former football player

See also
 
 Masny, commune in the Nord department in northern France

References

Czech-language surnames
Slovak-language surnames